To hear is to detect sound.

Hear or HEAR may also refer to:

Places
 El Arish International Airport, North Sinai, Egypt

Music
 Hear (Diesel album), an album by Diesel
 Hear!, Trixter album

Other uses
 H.E.A.R. (Hearing Education and Awareness for Rockers)
 Hawaiian Ecosystems at Risk project (HEAR)

See also
 Hearing (disambiguation)
 Here (disambiguation)